Group A of the 2010 FIFA World Cup began on 11 June and ended on 22 June 2010. The group consisted of host nation South Africa, Mexico, Uruguay and the runners-up from 2006, France.

France and South Africa previously met at the 1998 FIFA World Cup, when then-hosts France beat South Africa 3–0. They also previously met with Uruguay at the 2002 FIFA World Cup; the match ended in a 0–0 draw. France and Mexico were in the same group at the first ever World Cup in 1930; the two nations played the first-ever World Cup match and France won 4–1. France and Mexico had also met in 1954 but neither team qualified for the next round. This is also the second time that France, Mexico and Uruguay have been drawn in the same group with the host nation. They were grouped with England in 1966, when England and Uruguay advanced to the next round.

South Africa became the first World Cup host team to fail to advance past the group stage after finishing behind Mexico on goal difference. France, despite having made the final at the previous edition of the World Cup, were also eliminated after drawing one and losing two matches, including one against South Africa.

Standings

Uruguay advanced to play South Korea (runners-up of Group B) in the round of 16.
Mexico advanced to play Argentina (winners of Group B) in the round of 16.

Matches
All times local (UTC+2)

South Africa vs Mexico
South Africa vs Mexico was the opening match of the World Cup, held on 11 June 2010. It was described as an "enthralling" and "pulsating" match. South Africa opened the scoring in the 55th minute after Siphiwe Tshabalala scored off a pass through Mexico's defence by Kagiso Dikgacoi. Mexico's captain Rafael Márquez equalised following a corner kick in the 79th minute. In the final minutes of the match, Katlego Mphela almost scored a winning goal for South Africa, but his shot bounced off the post.

Tshabalala was named as the man of the match. South Africa's coach, Carlos Alberto Parreira called the result "fair", while Mexico's coach Javier Aguirre stated "we could have won, we could have lost".

Uruguay vs France

France and Uruguay faced each other on 11 June 2010 at the Cape Town Stadium. Despite a red card being given to Uruguay substitute Nicolás Lodeiro in the second half, Uruguay were able to hold a "lacklustre" France to a 0–0 draw. After the match, former World Cup-winning French player Zinedine Zidane criticised the French team and particularly coach Raymond Domenech for a lack of teamwork. Domenech claimed after the match to be "happy with the overall performance".

South Africa vs Uruguay
Uruguay took the lead in the 24th minute, when Diego Forlán launched a shot from 30 yards out that beat goalkeeper Itumeleng Khune, who did not attempt to save the shot. In the second half, Luis Suárez was left through on goal, but he was brought down by Khune. Referee Massimo Busacca awarded a penalty and showed Khune a red card. Deep into injury time, Uruguay scored their third goal when Álvaro Pereira tapped in a Suárez cross.

France vs Mexico
Mexico's 2–0 victory over France in Polokwane was overshadowed by French striker Nicolas Anelka launching a tirade of abuse towards coach Raymond Domenech during the half-time interval. Anelka was subsequently dismissed from the squad, which resulted in many squad members, including captain Patrice Evra, boycotting training in the lead-up to the final group stage match against South Africa.

Mexico vs Uruguay

France vs South Africa

References

Group A
Group
South Africa at the 2010 FIFA World Cup
Group
Group